Max E. Reno (April 22, 1926 – July 25, 2004) was an American politician and World War II veteran from the state of Iowa.

Reno was born in Bladensburg, Iowa in 1926. He attended Bloomfield public schools and junior college. Reno served as a Democrat in the Iowa Senate from 1965 to 1969. He died in 2004, and was interred in Bonaparte Cemetery, in Bonaparte, Iowa.

References

1926 births
2004 deaths
Iowa Democrats